Tejay is an unincorporated community located in Bell County, Kentucky, United States. It was named for Thomas Jefferson Asher (1848-1935), landowner and founder.

References

Unincorporated communities in Bell County, Kentucky
Unincorporated communities in Kentucky
Coal towns in Kentucky